Frederick Alfred Morris (11 March 1920 – 1973) was an English footballer who played as an inside forward.

Career
Morris began his professional career at Barnsley. In three years at the club, Morris made 23 league appearances, scoring nine times. In 1949, Morris signed for Southend United, where he scoring 16 times in 38 league games. During his career, Morris made 67 Football League appearances, scoring 25 times. In 1950, Morris signed for Chelmsford City, where he played at outside left.

References

1920 births
1973 deaths
Association football forwards
English footballers
Footballers from Sheffield
Barnsley F.C. players
Southend United F.C. players
Chelmsford City F.C. players
English Football League players
Southern Football League players